Robert Elliott (born 29 April 1953) is a former Australian rules footballer who played with Melbourne and St Kilda in the Victorian Football League (VFL). 

He is the younger brother of St Kilda Best and Fairest winner Glenn Elliott.

Elliott, in 1978, kicked a goal after the siren to give St Kilda a win over North Melbourne.

External links

1953 births
Living people
Australian rules footballers from Victoria (Australia)
Melbourne Football Club players
St Kilda Football Club players
People educated at Scotch College, Melbourne